Goniographa metafunkei is a moth of the family Noctuidae. It has a strictly limited distribution in the western part of the Tien-Shan Mountains and the Alai Mountains.

The wingspan is 30–35 mm.

External links
A Revision of the Palaearctic species of the Eugraphe (Hübner, 1821-1816) Generic complex. Parti. The genera Eugraphe and Goniographa (Lepidoptera, Noctuidae)

Noctuinae
Moths described in 2002